Cornelis "Kees" Staf (23 April 1905 – 10 September 1973) was a Dutch politician of the defunct Christian Historical Union (CHU) party now merged into the Christian Democratic Appeal (CDA) party and businessman.

Staf worked as student researcher at the National Agricultural and Forestry College from June 1926 until July 1928. Staf served in the Royal Netherlands East Indies Army as a Sergeant in the Corps of Engineers stationed in Sawah Besar from December 1928 until December 1929. Staf worked for the land reclamation Dutch Heidemaatschappij Company from December 1929 until January 1941 and served as CEO and Chairman of the board of directors from November 1939 until May 1941 and he also worked as a civil servant for the province of Gelderland from August 1939 until May 1940.

On 24 January 1951 the Cabinet Drees–Van Schaik fell and continued to serve in a demissionary capacity until the cabinet formation of 1951 when it was replaced by the Cabinet Drees I with Staf appointed as Minister of War and the Navy, taking office on 15 March 1951. Staf was elected as a Member of the House of Representatives after the election of 1952, taking office on 15 July 1952. After the cabinet formation of 1952 Staf continued as Minister of War and the Navy in the Cabinet Drees II, taking office on 2 September 1952. After the election of 1956 Staf returned as a Member of the House of Representatives, taking office on 3 July 1956. After the cabinet formation of 1956 Staf continued in the post as the newly renamed Minister of Defence in the Cabinet Drees III, taking office on 13 October 1956. On 16 February 1957 Staf resigned as Minister of Colonial Affairs following the appointment of Gerard Helders but continued as Minister of Defence. Staf served as acting Minister of Agriculture, Fisheries and Food Supplies following the appointment of Sicco Mansholt as the first European Commissioner from the Netherlands, serving from 1 January 1958 until 13 January 1958. The Cabinet Drees III fell on 11 December 1958 and continued to serve in a demissionary capacity until it was replaced by the caretaker Cabinet Beel II with Staf continuing as Minister of Defence and also took over as Minister of Agriculture, Fisheries and Food Supplies, taking office on 22 December 1958. In January 1959 Staf announced that he would not stand for the election of 1959. Following the cabinet formation of 1959 Staf per his own request asked not to be considered for a cabinet post in the new cabinet, the Cabinet Beel II was replaced by the Cabinet De Quay on 19 May 1959.

Staf remained in active politics, he became a Member of the Senate after the death of Gualthérus Kolff, taking office on 9 June 1959. In August 1960 Staf announced that he would not stand for the Senate election of 1960 and continued to serve as a backbencher until the end of the parliamentary term on 20 September 1960.

Decorations

References

External links

Official
  Ir. C. (Kees) Staf Parlement & Politiek
  Ir. C. Staf (CHU) Eerste Kamer der Staten-Generaal

 

 

1905 births
1973 deaths
Agricultural engineers
Christian Historical Union politicians
Commanders of the Order of Merit (Portugal)
Commanders of the Order of the Netherlands Lion
Dutch agronomists
Dutch civil engineers
Dutch corporate directors
Dutch expatriates in Indonesia
Dutch expatriates in Poland
Dutch expatriates in Portugal
Dutch members of the Dutch Reformed Church
Dutch military engineers
Dutch nonprofit directors
Grand Officiers of the Légion d'honneur
Grand Officers of the Order of Orange-Nassau
Members of the House of Representatives (Netherlands)
Members of the Senate (Netherlands)
Ministers of Agriculture of the Netherlands
Ministers of Colonial Affairs of the Netherlands
Ministers of Defence of the Netherlands
Ministers of the Navy of the Netherlands
Ministers of War of the Netherlands
People from Arnhem
People from Ede, Netherlands
Recipients of the Grand Cross of the Order of Leopold II
Recipients of the Order of the House of Orange
Royal Netherlands East Indies Army personnel
Wageningen University and Research alumni
Academic staff of Wageningen University and Research
Wrocław University of Technology alumni
20th-century Dutch businesspeople
20th-century Dutch civil servants
20th-century Dutch economists
20th-century Dutch engineers
20th-century Dutch military personnel
20th-century Dutch politicians